Kruhel Wielki is a part of the city Przemyśl, formerly it was a village in the administrative district of Gmina Krasiczyn, within Przemyśl County, Subcarpathian Voivodeship, in south-eastern Poland. The village was incorporated to Przemyśl on 1 January 2010.

References

Przemyśl
Neighbourhoods in Poland